Dan Crowley (born 28 August 1965) is a retired Australian rugby union player who played for the Australia national team 38 times and earned over 100 caps for the Queensland Reds during his rugby career. He became one of only 20 players who have won the Rugby World Cup on multiple occasions.

Crowley's family moved to Australia from the United Kingdom, first to Central Queensland, then to Brisbane.

Crowley made his first appearance for the Wallabies at age 23 on 1 July 1989 in a match against the British Lions, which Australia won 30 points to 12. He also played in the two subsequent tests, which the Lions won. His next appearance for the Wallabies was at the 1991 Rugby World Cup which Australia went on to win. He earned two international caps in 1999 in tests against Ireland and Wales. He also played against Canada in Calgary the following year. 

In 1995 he was capped twice for Australia for two games against Argentina, before heading to South Africa for the 1995 Rugby World Cup. He played in the losses to the Springboks and England. In 1997 he was capped on seven occasions for Australia, and then ten times during 1998. He was subsequently selected in Australia's 1999 Rugby World Cup squad for Wales. Crowley finished his international career as a double world champion, as his last game was the final against France, which Australia won 35 to 12. He is now one of the Reds' most capped players - with 124. He was also named on the bench of the Wallaby Team of the Decade. 

Crowley also worked as an undercover police officer with the Queensland Police Force, specialising in busting drug-rings on Queensland's Gold Coast. He writes of his experiences in his book Undercover Prop, and works as a motivational speaker. On some occasions, he was even working undercover during rugby tours in New Zealand.

References

External links
Former Wallaby Dan Crowley, abc.net.au; Retrieved 12 September 2014.
Dan Crowley profile, sporting-heroes.net; Retrieved 12 September 2014.

1965 births
Australian police officers
Australian rugby union players
Australia international rugby union players
Queensland Reds players
Leeds Tykes players
Living people
Rugby union props
Rugby union players from Brisbane